Lafayette High School is a public secondary school in James City County, Virginia, just outside the city limits of Williamsburg, Virginia.  It is part of Williamsburg-James City County Public Schools and is located at 4460 Longhill Road.

Most of the Williamsburg city limits is in the Lafayette High attendance zone.

History
Lafayette High School opened in 1973 and served as the sole high school for James City County and Williamsburg City.  The school itself is located in James City County though it has a Williamsburg mailing address.

In 1997, half of its student body with the exception of rising seniors were moved to Jamestown High School which opened to alleviate overcrowding at Lafayette.  The Williamsburg area began to develop rapidly in the late 1990s and 2000s, which prompted the opening of Warhill High School in 2007. Students were forced to redistrict.

Campus
The main office is located right at the main entrance of the school. The wide hallway opens up into the "upper commons". The cafeteria is located in this area. There are three lines for purchasing food. The auditorium is located to the left. Three large hallways branch out from the "upper commons." A smaller hallway leads to the girls locker room and the weight room used for athletic training. The first hallway across from the main office leads to the marketing classes, the gymnasium, the boys locker room, and the trailers, which will no longer be in use after the 2007–08 school year. There are two hallways which parallel the sides the auditorium. The first is known as the ramp. Another hallway at the top of the ramp leads to the fine arts classrooms. The other hallway leads to "the stairs. Another hallway branches off here as well. It leads to the mathematics and art classrooms. At the end of "the ramp" and "the stairs" is the "lower commons." The lower commons is a smaller gathering area that is busy when classes are changing. The Media Center is located at the back of the "lower commons." A loop goes around the media center. On one side is the semicircular world language and science hallway. On the outside of the semicircle is a pair of well equipped computer labs. On the other side is the social studies and technology hallway. At the back of the loop surrounding the Media Center is the entrance/exit to the bus loop. Two hallways branch off from the "lower commons." One leads to the small lecture hall and the fine arts hallway. The other leads to math hallway and the social studies hallway.

Enrollment

† New high schools opened in each of these years, leading to students being reassigned.

Teacher statistics 
 Full-time: 67 (2012-2013)
 Student/Teacher Ratio: 16.4:1

Demographics 
As of the 2012–2013 school year, Lafayette High School's student body was 61% (667) White; 25% (276) Black; 7% (79) Hispanic; 3% (29) Asian; and 4% (47) other.  The school was 53% male and 47% female.

Culture
Lafayette High School has several activities throughout the year. The first big occasion is the typical Spirit Week and Homecoming Dance. Lafayette is known in the school district for having a parade in Colonial Williamsburg that features each class making a float to accompany their class princes/princesses/kings/queens. A number of clubs also participate as well. One year, the Operation Smile club hosted a Sadie Hawkens Dance as a fundraiser. The sophomore class at one point held their Ring Dance at the school. Prom and After Prom have also been held at the school in past years. The school also has pep rallies for every sports season (Fall, Winter, and Spring).

Athletics

The mascot is a ram and the sports teams currently play in the AAAA Bay Rivers District. Lafayette High School has major track, cross country, and football programs that has produced several professional athletes. Lafayette enjoyed short a stint in the AA Bay Rivers District and will move to the AAAA Bay Rivers District in Fall 2015. Before Jamestown's opening, the Rams were in the AAA Peninsula District.  The Rams have won seventeen AA state titles.  They have five girls swimming titles from 2004–2008; one in field hockey in 2003; three titles in boys swimming in 1999, 2000, and 2009; two in boys indoor track in 2005 and 2015; one in boys outdoor track in 2005; one in AA Division 4 football in 2001; two consecutive individual girls tennis singles titles from 2007-2008; one in boys cross country in 2013; one in girls outdoor track in 2015; and in baseball in 2015 and 2019.

Band
The Lafayette Band program has won grand championships at several band festivals since the school opened in the early '70s under the direction of D. Keith Miller. During the period of the early '80s "Corp" style marching programs was introduced by Director Miller and carried on by Directors John Ford and Director David Smith. The fledgling marching program was making great strides with the new competitive program and with the introduction of a solid marching program that further inspired the students to raise Lafayette's band program to a higher level. The latter '80s brought a change when acclaimed Director Alan Wright took over changing the program back to concert format band. The band consistently received Superior Ratings and was viewed as one of the top concert and jazz band programs in the state. When Director Wright retired in the early 2000s, the new Director T. Jonathan Hargis reestablished the marching program. Mr. Chris Smith directed the band for a short time as Hargis had stints at Warhill HS and Berkeley Middle Schools. Hargis returned in Fall 2014. In the fall of 2019 the Marching Band received their second Superior rating.

Clubs
Lafayette has a number of clubs that have been around for years. They include:
Art Club,
Art Honor Society,
ASL (American Sign Language) Club,
Band,
Chamber Choir,
Dance Team,
Debate Team,
DECA,
FBLA,
Flag Squad,
Forensics Team,
French Club,
French Honor Society,
German Club,
German Honor Society,
Gay-Straight Alliance,
Harmonics,
Interact Club,
Jazz Ensemble,
Key Club,
Latin Club,
Latin Honor Society,
The Lafayette Ledger,
LESA,
Literary Magazine,
Logos,
Mock Trial Team,
Model UN,
Mu Alpha Theta (Math Honor Society),
National Honor Society,
Operation Smile,
Orchestra,
Peer Partners,
Project Reach-out,
Quill and Scroll,
Rams and Lambs,
SCA,
SGA,
Scholastic Bowl,
Show Choir,
Spanish Honor Society,
Student to Student,
Student Athletic Trainers,
TCE Skills USA,
Thespian Society,
Video Gaming Club, and
Yearbook

Theatre
Lafayette High School has a long tradition of an outstanding theatre program.  The current director is 2004 WJCC MS Teacher of the Year Suzan McCorry who has directed productions like Grease, Anything Goes, Happy Days, Thoroughly Modern Millie, Hairspray, Dirty Rotten Scoundrels, Lend Me a Tenor, A Piece of My Heart, and Noises Off. Lafayette's one-acts have a very successful history, having gone to states each year under McCorry's direction. The most recent production is Guys and Dolls in April 2022.

Past Directors Include: Jack Poland, Bill Snyder, Gail Albert, Rosemarie Allmann, and Phil Raybourn.

Notable alumni
Mark Carnevale, professional golfer, winner of 1992 Chattanooga Classic and 1992 PGA Tour Rookie of the Year.
Michael Derks, Balsac, the Jaws of Death, guitarist for the heavy metal band GWAR
Mel Gray, former kick returner for the NFL's New Orleans Saints, Detroit Lions, Houston Oilers and the Philadelphia Eagles.
Although Bruce Hornsby, three time Grammy Award winning pianist and singer, has been listed as an alumnus of Lafayette High School, he actually was in the last graduating class of James Blair High School, Williamsburg, Virginia, in June 1973.
Seneca Lassiter,1997, 2002 U.S. Outdoor 1,500m champ; 2001 U.S. Indoor mile champ; 1997, 98 NCAA 1500 champ; 1999 & 2001 USA 1,500m runner-up.
Chris Luzar, former NFL player.
Terrance Martin, former NFL player.
Mark Morton, guitar player for the heavy metal band Lamb of God
Maj. Anthony Mulhare, current Advance Pilot/Narrator for the United States Air Force Thunderbirds. Currently flies the number 8 jet on the team. AA Region I
Jessica Roulston, professional actor and producer for film and television. Emmy Award winner for Eric Clapton's Crossroads Guitar Festival in 2007, Visual FX producer for Academy Award-winning film, The Curious Case of Benjamin Button, and Visual FX producer for the teaser / trailer for Tron: Legacy are some highlights of her career.
Dr. Alan Theodore Sherman (’74) is Professor of Computer Science at the University of Maryland, Baltimore County (UMBC).  As director of the UMBC Chess Program, Sherman led the UMBC Chess Team to win a record six national collegiate championships and ten Pan-American championships.    He earned a PhD in computer science from MIT.
Canaan Smith, American country singer and a reality television contestant on The Amazing Race
Ron Springs, former running back for the NFL's Dallas Cowboys and Tampa Bay Buccaneers.
Lawrence Taylor, retired Hall of Fame American football player who played his entire career as a linebacker for the NFL's New York Giants. Regarded by many as the greatest defensive player of all time. Also holds the Giants career sack record with 142. Taylor also Defeated BAM BAM Bigelow At WWF's WrestleMania XI in 1995
Identical Twins Ross and James Hall, Class of 2003. Professional Wrestling Tag-Team, Hall Bros. 2003-2007, HallStars 2007-2018 Retired by WWE Hall of Fame Tag-Team Rock N Roll Express in Hampton, Va. March 3, 2018. Both were part of The 2001 AA Division 4 football State Championship Team and The 2002 AA Division 4 football State Runner-up. Ross(LB),James(Off. Guard)
Philippe Warren, Class of 2010. Navy Flight Surgeon and member of the United States Navy Blue Angels.

References

Public high schools in Virginia
Schools in James City County, Virginia
Education in Williamsburg, Virginia
Educational institutions established in 1973
1973 establishments in Virginia